Gheorghe Bodo (also known as Bodó György; 1923 – 2004) was a Romanian professional footballer who played his entire career for CA Oradea, as a midfielder. He played at international level in 8 matches for Romania and scored 2 goals, also being a member of the team that competed in the men's tournament of the 1952 Summer Olympics.

Honours
CA Oradea
Liga I: 1948–49

References

External links
 

1923 births
2004 deaths
People from Maramureș County
Romanian footballers
Romania international footballers
Olympic footballers of Romania
Footballers at the 1952 Summer Olympics
Association football midfielders
Liga I players
Liga II players
CA Oradea players